Words: The Very Best of Sharon O'Neill is the fourth compilation album from New Zealand born, Australian pop singer Sharon O'Neill. The album was released by Sony Music New Zealand on 18 April 2014.

Track listing

Charts

Release history

References

2014 compilation albums
Compilation albums by Australian artists
Sharon O'Neill albums